Locate di Triulzi is a comune (municipality) in the Metropolitan City of Milan in the Italian region Lombardy, located about  southeast of Milan.

Locate di Triulzi borders the following municipalities: San Donato Milanese, San Giuliano Milanese, Opera, Pieve Emanuele, Carpiano, Siziano. Sights include the 14th century Trivulzio Castle.

It is served by Locate Triulzi railway station.

References

External links
 Official website
 Locate di Triulzi on The Campanile Project

Cities and towns in Lombardy